Timothy Jacob Jensen (born 27 April 1962) is a Danish industrial designer. He was best known as CEO and Chief Designer of Jacob Jensen Design (Scandinavia’s oldest design studio) from 1990 to 2018. Jensen was also the founder of the Scandinavian brand JACOB JENSEN. He has created numerous well-known designs for timepieces, jewellery, communication equipment, houseware, furniture and kitchens. He has also been prominent within the automotive design, branding and value clarification fields.

Early life and career

Timothy Jacob Jensen was born in Copenhagen, Denmark, and was raised in Hejlskov (Central Jutland).  He is the son of the Danish industrial designer Jacob Jensen and Patricia Ryan.

Early career 
In 1978, Jensen became an apprentice at his father’s (Jacob Jensen) studio. Timothy Jacob Jensen joined Jacob Jensen, David Lewis, and Bang & Olufsen’s team of chief designers at the age of 17. In 1982, he became chief designer of Jacob Jensen Design. In 1985, he opened his own studio in Copenhagen called Voss Foerlev & Jensen. The studio closed in 1988, at which time Jensen started collaborating with various international designers including Ross Litell. In 1983, he designed his first car name "Logicar".

Founding JACOB JENSEN 
In 1985, he founded JACOB JENSEN. The company designs lifestyle products including watches, clocks, jewellery, smoke alarms, telephones, kitchen products, and other products. In 1985, Jensen designed wristwatches The Classic series models 510 and 520, which were included at the design study collection in the Museum of Modern Art (New York City).   In 1996, the wristwatches were also awarded “Watch of the Year.”

In 1990, he purchased Jacob Jensen Design and became the company's CEO and chief designer. Jensen developed Jacob Jensen Design internationally, collaborating with numerous major companies including ECCO (Danish shoe manufacturer), Gaggenau Hausgeräte, Bang & Olufsen, Haier, LG, Panasonic, Steinway Lyngdorf (Steinway and Sons), Toshiba, Vertu, Lufthansa, and Volvo. From 1991 to 1998, Jensen worked as chief designer for Gaggenau Hausgeräte’s design programme, where he designed ceramic hobs, built-in ovens, extractor hoods, dishwashers, washing machines and tumble dryers. A number of these products received awards including the EB900 Built-in oven and CK494 Glass ceramic hob. At 48 years of age, he became professor at Fudan University in Shanghai.

Jensen's works have been featured is various museums, including the Museum of Modern Art (New York City), the Musée des Arts décoratifs, Strasbourg (Paris), the Danish Museum of Art and Design (now known as Danish Museum of Art & Design), the Museum für angewandte Kunst Frankfurt  (Frankfurt), the Danish Watch Museum (Aarhus), Het Kleine Veenloo Museum (Veenendaal), Royal Library, Denmark (Copenhagen), Kalmar Konstmuseum (Kalmar), the Chicago Athenaeum (Chicago), Bauhaus Museum, Weimar (Berlin), Louisiana Museum of Modern Art (Copenhagen), Die Neue Sammlung (Munich), and others.

In 2011, Jensen founded his first subsidiary, the Jacob Jensen Design / DeTao Shanghai studio. The studio was created in collaboration with the DeTao Group at SIVA Campus in Shanghai. In 2014, Jacob Jensen Design established its second subsidiary studio named Jacob Jensen Design / KMUTT Bangkok. The studio was founded in collaboration with King Mongkut's University of Technology Thonburi. Jensen terminated his position and sold all of his shares from Jacob Jensen Design May 2018 and stopped working for the company in October 2018. He left Jacob Jensen Design to start new businesses including Timothyjacobjensenstudios.com (2019), DesignersTrust(2021), Bytimothy(2022).

Other Work 
Timothy Jacob Jensen was appointed as Master of the DeTao Masters Academy in Beijing in 2011. He was later appointed as Honorary professor at the Shanghai Institute of Visual Art (SIVA), China. Jensen was subsequently awarded the title of High-level Expert by the China Industrial Design Association (CIDA). He currently also serves as a lecturer at universities, companies, and other institutions.

Timothy Jacob Jensen was appointed by the iF International Forum Design to be jury member of iF design Award 2019 in the 'Discipline Product’ category. He founded Timothy Jacob Jenson Studios. As CEO at Jacob Jensen Design, he founded the Scandinavian lifestyle brand Jacob Jensen, which is currently represented in 30 countries.

In 2017 Jensen was named Designer of the Year in China, and in 2019 he was selected as jury member for the iF Product Design Award. Jensen is considered the most awarded Danish designer, heading the most award-winning design family in the world.

Jacob Jensen Design

In 1990, Jensen became chief executive officer and chief designer of Jacob Jensen Design, and expanded the company internationally.  The studio focuses on design, and has branches in Denmark, China, and Thailand. In 2018, Jensen left his positions as chief designer, CEO and board member, and is currently working under his own name. In 2019 he founded Timothy Jacob Jensen Studios, and in 2021 he launched digital SaaS platform Designers Trust. In June 2022 the Skive Municipality gave Barack Obama and his family the gift of four wrist watches by the Timothy Jacob Jensen Studios. The watches were designed by Timothy Jensen and his daughter.

Design Style

Timothy Jacob Jensen developed his father's design works, which involved the merging of the International style (architecture) and MAYA style.  Jensen turned his father's two-dimensional graphic works into three-dimensional designs, applying this to multiple major brands including Gaggenau, Vertu, Steinway Lyngdorf (Steinway & Sons), and JACOB JENSEN. Jensen's maxim is “Form follows feeling.”

Gaggenau Hausgeräte

From 1991 to 1998, Jensen was served as designer for Gaggenau Hausgeräte’s design programme. This comprised several ranges of products including ceramic hobs, built-in ovens, extractor hoods, dishwashers, washing machines, and tumble dryers. A number of these products received awards, primarily in Germany. These include the EB900 Built-in oven and CK494 Glass ceramic hob. In 1995, Gaggenau Hausgeräte was acquired by Bosch-Semiens Hausgeräte (BSH Hausgeräte).

Works

Timothy Jacob Jensen’s best known works include the Bang & Olufsen Beocenter 9000 (1986), Bang & Olufsen Beowatch (1993), Jabra JX10 Bluetooth headset (2005), Vertu Aerius Bluetooth headset (2006), Gaggenau EB900 Built-in oven (1993),  Gaggenau CK494 Glass ceramic hob (1993), Rosti Mepal Victoria Bowl (2008), Steinway Lyngdorf Model D Music System (2007), Toshiba WL768 flat screen television (2010), Tommerup Kister Diamant 32 Coffin (2010), Lufthansa First Class Aminety Kit (2016), Danzka The Spirit (2016), Phicomm K3 Router (2017), Classic Watch (Model 510), JACOB JENSEN Strata Watch 270 and 280 (2014), JACOB JENSEN Smoke Alarm (2001), Telephone T3, JACOB JENSEN Air Quality Monitor (2016), JACOB JENSEN Weather station series  (1999), and others.

Awards

 IF Award (1990–2018, Germany)
 China Red Star Design Award (2013–2017, China)
 German Design Award (2012–2017, Germany)
 Red Dot Award (1993–2017, Germany)
 Design Plus Award (1988–2016, Germany)
 German Design Award (2012–2018, Germany)
 IDA Awards, (2016, U.S.)
 Plus X Award (2006–2016, Germany)
 Good Design Award (1985–2012, Japan)
 Designer of the Year (2017, China).

Personal life

Timothy Jacob Jensen has two daughters, Toko and Freja.

See also

 Danish Modern
 Jørn Utzon
 Raymond Loewy
 Jacob Jensen
 International style (architecture)

References

External links 
 www.timothyjacobjensen.com
 www.oobject.com/category/10-classic-jacob-jensen-gadgets

 https://timothyjacobjensen.com/timothy-jacob-jensen/
 issuu.com/worldofjacobjensen/docs/jacobjensendesign

Living people
1962 births
Danish industrial designers